Nuhu Abdullahi Balarabe (born in 3 January 1991) is a Nigerian film actor, Producer and Politician  born and raised in Kano State. Nuhu is one of the most promising Kannywood actors, he acts in both Hausa and English movies. He has won the best supporting actor in Kannywood at the City People Entertainment Awards in 2015,

Career
Nuhu Abdullahi joined Kannywood film industry in 2009 as a film producer, he has produced numbers of movies including Baya da Kura, Mafarin Tafiya, Ana Wata ga Wata, Ta leko ta koma, Mugun Zama, Rana Tara, Fulanin Asali, Kuskurena, Mujarrabi, and many more. Nuhu made his first movie appearance in a movie titled Ashabul Kahfi, he gained fame after his acting in one of the blockbuster movies call Kanin Miji.

Filmography

See also
 List of Nigerian actors
 List of Nigerian film producers
 List of Kannywood actors

References

1991 births
Nigerian male film actors
Living people
People from Kano
Male actors in Hausa cinema
21st-century Nigerian male actors
Kannywood actors
Nigerian film producers